The 2017–18 Portland Pilots women's basketball team represents the University of Portland in the 2017–18 NCAA Division I women's basketball season. The Pilots were led by fourth year coach Cheryl Sorensen. They play their homes games at Chiles Center and were members of the West Coast Conference. They finished the season 7–23, 3–15 in WCC play to finish in last place. They lost in the first round of the WCC women's tournament to Pacific.

Previous season
They finished the season 6–24, 4–14 in WCC play to finish in last place. They lost in the first round of the WCC women's tournament to Pacific.

Roster

Schedule and results

|-
!colspan=9 style=| Exhibition

|-
!colspan=9 style=| Non-conference regular season

|-
!colspan=9 style=| WCC regular season

|-
!colspan=9 style=| WCC Women's Tournament

See also
 2017–18 Portland Pilots men's basketball team

References

Portland
Portland Pilots women's basketball seasons